candycoatedwaterdrops is the second album of Christian singer Plumb. It has been critically acclaimed, and singles have appeared on major motion picture soundtracks such as Bruce Almighty and Drive Me Crazy. The songs "Stranded" and "Here with Me" were covered by Jennifer Paige on her second album Positively Somewhere, with the former track becoming a single and an airplay hit in mainland Europe.

Track listing

Covers
"Damaged" was covered by the trance group Plummet in 2001. There are two versions of the music video; one which includes a girl with balloons and another with mannequins.

"Here with Me" and "Stranded" were covered by Jennifer Paige on her second album Positively Somewhere in 2001.

Personnel 
 B.J. Aberle – bass, editing, mastering, loop editing
 Tiffany Arbuckle – vocals, background vocals
 Toni Armani – make-up, hair stylist
 Thad Beaty – guitar
 Steve Bishir – engineer, mixing
 Richard Bissell – horn
 John Bradbury – violin
 Gary Burnette – guitar
 George Cocchini – guitar
 Dermot Crehan – violin
 Paul Cullington – double bass
 Philip Eastop – percussion
 Jon Evans-Jones – violin
 Chris Fogel – mixing
 Steve Henderson – oboe
 Rebecca Hirsch – violin
 Tom Howard – arranger, conductor
 Jimmy Jernigan – percussion, engineer
 Fats Kaplin – lap steel guitar
 Paul Kegg – cello
 Patrick Kelly – engineer
 Jennifer Kemp – clothing, wardrobe
 Patrick Kiernan – violin
 Boguslaw Kostecki – violin
 Peter Lale – viola
 Chris Laurence – double bass
 Tony Lewis – cello
 Ken Love – mastering
 Jerry MacPherson – guitar
 Paul Martin – viola
 Jim McLeod – violin
 Tony Miracle – programming
 Perry Montague-mason – violin
 David Nolan – violin
 Peter Oxer – violin
 Michelle Pearson – project coordinator
 John Pigneguy – horn
 Joe Porter – drums
 Mike Purcell – programming, engineer
 Michael Quinlan – loop programming
 Tamara Reynolds – photography
 Ric Robbins – DJ
 Glenn Rosenstein – guitar, programming, background vocals, producer, engineer, Mellotron, VOX continental
 Frank Schaefer – cello
 Dan Shike – mixing assistant
 F. Reid Shippen – mixing
 Matt Stanfield – synthesizer, piano, programming, Mellotron
 Traci Sterling – production coordination
 Jackie Street – bass
 Aaron Swihart – engineer
 Brad Burke - assistant engineer
 Cathy Thompson – violin
 Lori Turk – make-up, hair stylist
 Kate Wilkinson – viola
 Jonathan Williams – cello
 Bob Wohler – executive producer
 Gavyn Wright – violin

References

1999 albums
Plumb (singer) albums
Essential Records (Christian) albums